

Johannes Barge (23 March 1906 – 28 February 2000) was an officer in the Wehrmacht of Nazi Germany during World War II who was responsible for German military operations causing the Cephalonia Massacre in September 1943.

Awards and decorations

 German Cross in Gold on 28 July 1943 as Major in Infanterie-Bataillon 550 z.b.V.
 Knight's Cross of the Iron Cross on 10 May 1945 as Oberst and commander of Festungs-Grenadier-Regiment Kreta

Notes

References

Citations

Bibliography

 
 
 

1906 births
2000 deaths
Recipients of the Gold German Cross
Recipients of the Knight's Cross of the Iron Cross
German prisoners of war in World War II held by the United Kingdom
People from Lippe
Military personnel from North Rhine-Westphalia